The Union of State Supporters (USS) is an Egyptian political group established in 2016 to support the Egyptian State. It was created in 2016 by Shaymaa Refaat and Amr Abdel-Hakim Amer. The Union of State Supporters (USS) has over 70,000 members and most of the group's activities are online. The group owns an online newspaper, which publishes in Arabic and has an English section called "Cairo Post".

References

2016 establishments in Egypt
Egyptian nationalism
Organizations established in 2016
Political organisations based in Egypt